Patricia Hekia Parata (born 1 November 1958) is a former New Zealand politician and former member of the New Zealand House of Representatives, having been elected to parliament in the 2008 general election as a member of the New Zealand National Party. She served as the Minister of Education in the Fifth National Government.

Early life and career
Born and raised in Ruatoria, Parata shares Scottish, Irish, English, Ngāi Tahu and Ngāti Porou ancestry. She was one of eight children to her mother, Hīria Te Kiekie Reedy of Ngāti Porou. Her maternal grandfather was Arnold Reedy. Her father, Ron Parata, was of Ngāi Tahu descent and was raised in Puketeraki, near Dunedin. He served in the Māori Battalion and was a teacher and then principal at Ngata Memorial College in Ruatoria. Tame Parata, a Member of Parliament from 1885 to 1911, was Hekia Parata's great-great-grandfather. One of Parata's sisters, Nori Parata, is Principal at Tolaga Bay Area School. Another sister, Apryll Parata, is a Deputy Secretary at the Ministry of Education (although was first employed in this role prior to Hekia Parata's appointment as Minister of Education).

Parata attended the University of Waikato, where she graduated with a Master of Arts degree. While at Waikato, she served as President of the Waikato Student Union in 1980. She received a distinguished alumni award from the university in 2011. During the Springbok rugby tour of 1981 Parata took an active part in protests against the tour, including the protest at Rugby Park in Hamilton, which ended in a pitch invasion that stopped the match. She has stated that was unable to join the pitch invasion due to a plaster cast from the hip following surgery for a netball injury. Parata was a Youth Representative at the first Hui Taumata held in 1984.

Parata joined the National Party in August 2001. Parata was a Senior Executive Fellow at the Kennedy School of Government at Harvard University.

Public servant
Parata worked in the state sector, eventually becoming Deputy Chief Executive of Te Puni Kōkiri, the Ministry of Māori Development. She also served on the boards of NZ On Air (a broadcasting funding authority) and the Ngai Tahu Development Corporation. Later, she moved into the private sector, establishing the consultancy firm Gardiner and Parata Ltd.

In 1997, Parata was appointed by Prime Minister Jim Bolger as a member of the Towards 2000 Taskforce, to "advise the Government on the appropriate "vision", events for the [millennium] celebrations and national projects of lasting public benefit".

Controversies
Parata's name was connected to an investigation by the State Services Commissioner Don Hunn into the improper use of public funds in the purchase of two vehicles for her partner (and at that time Te Puni Kōkiri chief executive) Wira Gardiner in 1995. Parata's name was on the purchase orders issued by the Ministry, although it eventually became known that the cars were paid by and for Mr Gardiner at the time of purchase. The investigation cleared both Gardiner and Parata of any illegal activity, and the cars were returned to the Ministry for re-sale at a Government auction.

Parata's consultancy firm was contracted to recommend the best options for providing "ongoing high quality Māori advice" to Chief Executive Christine Rankin and senior managers at the Department of Work and Income in 1999, at a cost of $207,500. The expenditure was criticised by Green MP Rod Donald, as the Māori unemployment rate rose during this period from 27 to 29%. The firm also attracted controversy when National MP Murray McCully criticised the spending of $240,000 by the Ministry of Economic Development for training courses on the Treaty of Waitangi run by the company in 2003.

In 2001, Parata was appointed to the Māori Television Service Board. She resigned within two months, reportedly blaming a "lack of funding" for the new Māori TV channel.

Political career

2002 general election
Parata was selected as the National Party candidate in the Wellington Central electorate for the 2002 general election, the first time the party had run a candidate in the electorate since the 1996 election. The campaign was managed by her husband, Wira Gardiner.
Receiving 10,725 votes, she came second to incumbent Labour MP Marian Hobbs by 4,181 votes. In spite of Parata's presence in the race, the party vote in the electorate dropped to 56% of their 1999 result (or 19.9% of votes cast), mirroring that of the National party vote result nationwide. The National Party's 20.93% result on the nationwide party vote meant that Parata did not enter Parliament as a list MP.

Parata wrote a chapter describing her experience as the candidate in New Zealand votes: the general election of 2002, a review of the election.

Don Brash leadership of the National Party

In a speech given by the National Party leader Don Brash to the Orewa Rotary Club on 27 January 2004, he spoke on the perceived "Māori racial separatism" in New Zealand. The speech, while being suggested as the main reason for a major surge in public support for the National Party (after their 2002 election provided the party's worst ever result), was displeasing to Parata and other Māori members of the National Party. Parata was reported as saying "this is taking the party back to the past. The views expressed [in the speech] marginalise New Zealand into a small island of rednecks". Nevertheless, Parata did not leave National and Brash was eventually replaced as leader of National (after quitting as leader) in 2006 by John Key.

Parata's husband Wira Gardiner described the situation for him and Parata during this period in a 2008 interview: "We seriously contemplated whether the National Party was ever going to be the party for us...but in the end we didn't abandon it, we just went to sleep for a while." 
Reflecting back on this period in 2010, Parata said: "I didn't consider them wilderness years; I had a particular disagreement with a particular person and his outlook at the time."

2008 general election

Having neither appeared as a candidate for an electorate, nor on the National Party list for the 2005 general election, Parata returned to politics, being selected as the National Party candidate in the Mana electorate for the 2008 election. Although losing to the incumbent Labour MP Luamanuvao Winnie Laban, she performed better than the National Party candidate in the 2005 election, Chris Finlayson, as well as an increased party vote percentage from three years previously.

In spite of the electorate result, Parata was elected to Parliament as a list MP, having been ranked 36 on the National Party List.

Member of Parliament
 

In her maiden speech, Parata alluded to her great-great-grandfather Tame Parata, who was an MP in the Southern Māori electorate for the Liberal Party from 1885 to 1911, in addition to her tupuna (ancestor) Āpirana Ngata:

"I enter Parliament and begin this phase of my public service journey proud to follow in the footsteps of these ancestors in the pursuit of quality citizenship for all. They provide a model that I am glad to emulate: unambiguously Ngati Porou and Ngai Tahu; unequivocally a New Zealander...As I stand before you today, I am at once conscious of the weight of history and expectation that press upon me, and the lightness of possibilities that beckon. I am familiar with this dichotomy – I have grown up in a culture that walks through the present, with the constant companions of the past and the future."

She has had an Out of Parliament office in the electorate (in the Mana suburb) since becoming an MP.

2010 Mana by-election

On 10 August 2010, Labour MP Luamanuvao Winnie Laban announced that she would resign from Parliament to take up a position as an assistant vice-chancellor at Victoria University of Wellington, leading to a by-election in the Mana electorate.

Parata was the sole candidate for the National Party, winning the nomination without contest. Parata received 41% of all votes cast, an increase of 6% from the 2008 election, where she was also the candidate. Although she lost to Kris Faafoi by 1406 votes, the result was seen as a strong performance from Parata.

2011 general election
Parata announced her intentions to stand again in the Mana electorate for the 2011 general election, suggesting that her failure to win the seat in two attempts is "unfinished business". Kris Faafoi retained the seat with a slightly increased majority of 2,230.

Minister in Fifth National Government

In December 2010, it was announced that Parata would take over the cabinet positions formerly held by Pansy Wong (after her resignation from Cabinet coming soon after a scandal emerged involving the use of taxpayer funded travel) including the Women's and Ethnic Affairs portfolios, as well as taking up the newly created Associate Ministerial portfolios of Energy and Community & Voluntary sector. In February 2011, Parata became the acting Minister of Energy and Resources, relieving Gerry Brownlee to concentrate on his role as Minister for Canterbury Earthquake Recovery after the catastrophic February 2011 Christchurch earthquake.

Minister of Education
Parata was appointed as Minister of Education following the 2011 general election, succeeding Anne Tolley. She was expected to implement the National Government's plans to improve the quality of teaching and shake up the sector – but got into difficulty almost immediately. She introduced proposals to increase class sizes, leading to claims that it would cause some intermediate schools to lose up to nine teachers. As a result of intense public backlash over the issue, the plan was abandoned soon after it was introduced. Parata also had to negotiate the introduction of charter schools as part of National's confidence-and-supply agreement with John Banks.

In September 2012, she announced that she planned to close or merge 31 schools in Christchurch and the surrounding Waimakariri and Selwyn districts. Twenty-two of the schools said the information on which the Ministry based its decision to justify the proposed closures was incorrect. In February 2013, Parata confirmed the Government would close seven Christchurch schools due to falling roll numbers and earthquake damage, in addition to two that had already closed voluntarily. Twelve schools would also be merged into six.

Each of these proposals was met with staunch opposition from affected parties and led to media speculation about Parata's performance and abilities. The New Zealand Educational Institute (NZEI) which represents primary school teachers, said she was "living in a fantasy world".

Parata also oversaw the introduction of the controversial Novopay payroll system which cost $30 million and was supposed to streamline payments to teachers and school staff. It had the opposite effect – with thousands of teachers receiving either too much, too little or not being paid at all. It was later revealed that the Ministry had spent $650,000 trialling the system. It was rolled out nationally even though more than half of the 731 trial-users felt they were not ready for the system to go live. Along the way, Parata fell out with newly recruited education secretary Lesley Longstone, who was forced to resign over the debacle. There were calls for Parata to follow suit. In 2013, Fairfax Media revealed 'internal office tensions' among her staff; several private secretaries and a senior adviser left her office in the Beehive. Her senior private secretary resigned just before Christmas and the advisor was only two months into a two-year secondment. At least one Beehive staff member issued a personal grievance claim.

New Zealand Herald commentator Audrey Young said "Parata came in with high expectations about how to lift student achievement, but an unrealistic view of what the Ministry of Education was capable of doing". She believed Parata was ill-prepared for the role as Education Minister, pointing out that she had never spent even one day in opposition – let alone as opposition spokesperson for education.

After surviving a Cabinet reshuffle in January 2013 that saw two of her ministerial colleagues dumped, Parata said she had made "one or two mistakes". However, Prime Minister John Key removed responsibility for managing the Novopay system from Parata, giving that job to Steven Joyce. Political commentator Bryce Edwards suggested she only kept her job because she was a "relatively attractive... Māori woman". A One News Colmar Brunton poll in February 2013 saw 59% of those surveyed believed the Prime Minister made the wrong decision by keeping Parata on.

2014 general election
During the 2014 New Zealand general election, Parata unsuccessfully contested Mana, which was retained by the Labour MP Kris Faafoi. However, she was re-elected on the National Party list.

Retirement from politics 
In October 2016, Hekia Parata announced that she would not seek reelection at the 2017 election and would retire from politics.

Parata resigned as Minister of Education on 2 May 2017, and was succeeded by Nikki Kaye.

Personal life 
Parata was married to former professional soldier, senior public servant and author Wira Gardiner. Since Wira received his knighthood in 2008, Parata has been able to use the official style Lady Gardiner, however she rarely does so. Parata and Gardiner met while they worked together at the Ministry of Māori Development, Te Puni Kōkiri. They have two children together and three stepchildren from Gardiner's previous marriage to former MP Pauline Gardiner.

References

External links
Hekia Parata MP official site
Profile at National Party

Maiden speech (via Kiwiblog)

1958 births
Living people
University of Waikato alumni
New Zealand National Party MPs
Māori MPs
New Zealand education ministers
Members of the Cabinet of New Zealand
Members of the New Zealand House of Representatives
New Zealand list MPs
Women government ministers of New Zealand
Ngāi Tahu people
Ngāti Porou people
Unsuccessful candidates in the 2002 New Zealand general election
People from Ruatoria
21st-century New Zealand politicians
21st-century New Zealand women politicians
Women members of the New Zealand House of Representatives
Māori politicians